The I. N. Debenham House is a private house located at 1101 Emmet Street in Petoskey, Michigan. It was placed on the National Register of Historic Places in 1986.

The I. N. Debenham House is a -story frame Queen Anne structure with multiple gabled and hip roof bays. A single-story wing is attached at the rear. The house is covered with clapboards, with fishscale shingles ornamenting the gable ends. A single-story porch wraps around the facade, with an additional small porch on the second story. Both porches have turned decorative elements. The windows have a single pane on the bottom, with multi-light units above.

The house was built some time before 1899. It is associated with I.N. Debenham, a carpenter who lived here around the turn of the century, and Benjamin Snatts, an inspector for the Michigan Telephone Company, who lived here after 1903.

References

Houses on the National Register of Historic Places in Michigan
Queen Anne architecture in Michigan
Houses in Emmet County, Michigan
Houses completed in the 19th century